Liang Dunyan (1857, Foshan, Guangdong, Qing Empire – May 10, 1924, Tianjin, Republic of China) was a Qing dynasty diplomat and politician. A graduate of Yale University, he served as the minister of foreign affairs in the first cabinet of China under Yikuang (Prince Qing) and later in the cabinet of Yuan Shikai. A monarchist, he supported the Manchu Restoration of July 1917 and was the foreign minister under Zhang Xun.

Bibliography

References

1857 births
1924 deaths
Premiers of the Republic of China
Qing dynasty diplomats
Politicians from Foshan
Qing dynasty politicians from Guangdong
Republic of China politicians from Guangdong
Yale University alumni
Foreign Ministers of the Qing dynasty